Yahoo! Podcasts was a podcasting directory service that let users download, stream online, subscribe (via RSS) and review podcasts. It also allowed users to search for podcasts or browse from a podcast directory.

Yahoo! shut down the service on October 31, 2007.

References 

Podcasts
Podcasting software
Internet properties disestablished in 2007